Daniel Peter Rosewarne (born 1981) is a New Zealand politician and Member of Parliament in the House of Representatives for the Labour Party.

Biography

Early life and career
Rosewarne joined the New Zealand Army aged 18 and served on several operational tours, including two to Afghanistan. He deployed as part of the regional assistance mission to the Solomon Islands in 2008 and provided disaster relief to Christchurch after the 2011 earthquakes and to Kaikoura after the 2016 quake. In 2014 Rosewarne was diagnosed with leukaemia and took immunotherapy drugs in order to beat the condition which would have otherwise been terminal.

Political career

In the 2017 general election, Rosewarne stood in the electorate of Waimakariri for the Labour party. Labour's long-running candidate for that electorate, Clayton Cosgrove retired from politics at the 2017 election. He was placed 52 on Labour's list.

He was defeated by Matt Doocey by 10,766 votes. He was reselected three years later to contest Waimakariri again in the 2020 general election. He lost to Doocey again, but picked up a large swing, cutting Doocey's majority to 1,507 votes. He was sworn in at Parliament on 26 July 2022 off the Labour list, following the resignation of Kris Faafoi.

He missed out with Chairman of the Banks Peninsula Community Board Reuben Davidson winning the selection.

Personal life
He lives in Waimakariri with his wife and their two children.

References

1981 births
Living people
New Zealand Labour Party MPs
Members of the New Zealand House of Representatives
New Zealand list MPs
Unsuccessful candidates in the 2017 New Zealand general election
Unsuccessful candidates in the 2020 New Zealand general election
New Zealand Army personnel
New Zealand military personnel of the War in Afghanistan (2001–2021)